Stupsk  is a village in Mława County, Masovian Voivodeship, in east-central Poland. It is the seat of the gmina (administrative district) called Gmina Stupsk.

References

Stupsk
Płock Governorate
Warsaw Voivodeship (1919–1939)